Patty Schnyder was the defending champion, but lost in quarterfinals to Lucie Šafářová.

Lucie Šafářová won the title by defeating Flavia Pennetta 6–3, 6–4 in the final.

Seeds

Draw

Finals

Top half

Bottom half

External links
 WTA tournament draws
 ITF tournament edition details

Mondial Australian Women's Hardcourts
2006 Mondial Australian Women's Hardcourts